The Alberta men's provincial floorball team is the men's provincial floorball team of Alberta, and a member of Floorball Canada. Alberta's men's team is currently ranked 3rd in Canada at floorball, based on their performance at the 2009 Canadian Floorball Championships.

Alberta maintains a strong rivalry in floorball with Ontario. The majority of players on Team Alberta are Canadian and Polish. The team is organized by Floorball Alberta.

The team has seen relatively little success (with only 3 wins), but nevertheless has finished 3rd in Canada twice.

Team Roster

As of December 6, 2010

All-Time Team Records

Canadian Nationals

Floorball
Alberta